Pyrus hakkiarica is a species of plant in the family Rosaceae. It is endemic to Turkey.

References

Endemic flora of Turkey
hakkiarica
Data deficient plants
Taxonomy articles created by Polbot